Enrico Battaglin (born 17 November 1989) is a professional road cyclist, who currently rides for UCI ProTeam .

Career
Born in Marostica, Italy, Battaglin was signed by Colnago at the age of 17 because they felt he had a lot of potential, but spent 4 years in the youth ranks before graduating to the main team. He made a major impact immediately after joining the professional ranks, winning the Coppa Sabatini as a stagiaire in 2011.

In 2013 Battaglin won the fourth stage of the Giro d'Italia, a  affair concluding with two climbs. He won the sprint of the main group ahead of fellow Italians Fabio Felline and Giovanni Visconti. He was named in the startlist for the 2016 Vuelta a España.

Major results

2007
 9th Overall Giro della Lunigiana
1st Stage 4
2008
 8th Trofeo Gianfranco Bianchin
2009
 1st Giro Valli Aretine
 3rd Trofeo Città di San Vendemiano
 3rd Giro del Medio Brenta
 6th Overall Giro del Friuli-Venezia Giulia
 8th Gran Premio Palio del Recioto
 8th Coppa della Pace
2010
 1st  Overall Giro delle Regioni
1st Stage 1
 1st Gran Premio San Giuseppe
 1st GP Capodarco
 2nd Gran Premio Palio del Recioto
 3rd Trofeo Città di San Vendemiano
 3rd Gran Premio di Poggiana
 7th Trofeo Alcide Degasperi
2011
 1st Trofeo Zsšdi
 1st Gran Premio San Giuseppe
 1st Coppa Sabatini
 1st GP Ezio del Rosso
 2nd Giro del Medio Brenta
 2nd GP Capodarco
 3rd Giro del Belvedere
 3rd Giro della Romagna
 4th Gran Premio Palio del Recioto
 6th Gran Premio di Poggiana
 7th Overall Girobio
 7th Trofeo Melinda
2012
 1st Stage 1b (TTT) Monviso-Venezia — Il Padania
 3rd Gran Premio di Lugano
 7th Overall Tour of Turkey
2013
 1st Stage 4 Giro d'Italia
 3rd Trofeo Matteotti
 8th Giro di Toscana
2014
 1st Stage 14 Giro d'Italia
 4th Coppa Ugo Agostoni
 5th Coppa Sabatini
 7th Giro dell'Appennino
2015
 4th Volta Limburg Classic
 5th Trofeo Matteotti
2016
 9th Cadel Evans Great Ocean Road Race
2017
 8th Japan Cup
2018
 1st Stage 5 Giro d'Italia
 9th Cadel Evans Great Ocean Road Race
2020
 7th Coppa Sabatini
 8th Giro dell'Appennino
2021
 3rd Giro dell'Appennino

Grand Tour general classification results timeline

References

External links

1989 births
Living people
Italian male cyclists
Cyclists from the Province of Vicenza
Italian Giro d'Italia stage winners